Von Gabain is a surname. Notable people with the surname include:

Alexander von Gabain, German biologist 
Annemarie von Gabain  (1901—1993), German scholar

German-language surnames